Ile Alayo is a 2021 yoruba language comedy drama series directed by Femi Adebayo airing on Wakaati TV and ST Nollywood Plus. It is produced by StarTimes.

Cast 

 Mr Macaroni
 Broda Shaggi
 Odunlade Adekola
 Mercy Aigbe
 Adebayo Salami
 Lateef Adedimeji
 Dele Odule
 Woli Agba
 Femi Adebayo
 Ebun Oloyede
 Cute Abiola
 Wale Akorede

References 

Nigerian comedy television series
2021 Nigerian television series debuts
English-language television shows
Television shows set in Lagos
Nigerian drama television series
Yoruba-language television shows